William Butler BDec (d. 1519) was a Canon of Windsor from 1503 to 1519

Career
He was appointed to the sixth stall in St George's Chapel, Windsor Castle in 1503 and held the canonry until 1519.

Notes 

1519 deaths
Canons of Windsor
Year of birth unknown